Five in the Black is the second Japanese studio album (fifth overall) by South Korean pop group Tohoshinki, released on March 14, 2007 by Rhythm Zone.

Track listing

Notes
 CD+DVD version of the album does not include tracks 14-16 ("Begin (Acapella version)", "Miss You (Ballad version)", and "A Whole New World").

Charts and sales

Oricon sales charts (Japan)

Korean monthly foreign albums & singles

Korea yearly foreign albums & singles

Singles in Oricon charts

References

2007 albums
TVXQ albums
Avex Group albums
Japanese-language albums